Capnella is a genus of soft corals in the family Nephtheidae. They are also commonly known as Kenya tree corals.

Species
Capnella arbuscula Verseveldt, 1977
Capnella australiensis (Thorpe, 1928)
Capnella bouilloni Verseveldt, 1976
Capnella erecta Verseveldt, 1977
Capnella fructosa
Capnella fungiformis Kükenthal, 1903
Capnella gaboensis Verseveldt, 1977
Capnella garetti Verseveldt, 1977
Capnella imbricata (Quoy & Gaimard, 1833)
Capnella johnstonei Verseveldt, 1977
Capnella lacertiliensis Macfadyen
Capnella parva Light, 1913
Capnella portlandensis Verseveldt, 1977
Capnella ramosa Light, 1913
Capnella sabangensis Roxas, 1933
Capnella shepherdi Verseveldt, 1977
Capnella spicata (May)
Capnella susanae Williams, 1988
Capnella thyrsoidea (Verrill, 1989)
Capnella watsonae Verseveldt, 1977

Description 
Capnella are arborescent, some species are lobed. Generally they are grey with brown polyps.  Colour intensity is dependent on light intensity, the higher the intensity of light, the lighter colour of the coral.  They form thick trunks with branches that closely resemble trees.  In stronger currents they form flatter colonies with shorter branches.

Distribution and habitats 
Kenya Tree corals are widespread throughout the Indo-pacific region, from the African coast to the Western Pacific.  They are found on coral reef slopes in clear water from deep to the shallows with strong tidal currents.  Sometimes found in shadier places and on coral rubble in shallow water close to the shore.

Biology 
They have symbiotic algae from which they obtain most of their nutrients.

Asexual reproduction has been observed. They form distinctive swellings at bottom of a branch which then drops off by fission at the swelling.  The branch then secures to a new hold and forms a new colony.  They can stick very quickly and will be firmly rooted within a day.  Colonies can bend and reattach to the rock or by “creeping” and division at the base.

References

Nephtheidae
Octocorallia genera
Taxa named by John Edward Gray